Astilbe thunbergii is a species of flowering plant in the genus Astilbe, native to Japan. Its hybrid cultivar 'Straussenfeder' has gained the Royal Horticultural Society's Award of Garden Merit.

Varieties
The following varieties are currently accepted:
Astilbe thunbergii var. thunbergii
Astilbe thunbergii var. kiusiana (H.Hara) H.Hara ex H.Ohba

References

thunbergii
Endemic flora of Japan
Plants described in 1867